Həzrə or Khazra or Khazrya or Khazry may refer to:
Həzrə, Qabala, Azerbaijan
Həzrə, Qusar, Azerbaijan
Green Dome in Medina, Saudi Arabia; also known as Qubbat-ul-Khazra in Arabic.